Danny "Big Black" Rey (1934) is an American actor, musician, and percussionist specializing in Latin and Ethnic Jazz music.

After playing at clubs and hotels in Miami and in calypso bands in the Bahamas during the 1950s, he moved to New York in the early 1960s, working mostly with Randy Weston, as well as performing with Junior Cook.

In 1965 he played with Dizzy Gillespie and Ray Bryant and performed and recorded with Freddie Hubbard. The following year he was back with Weston’s band at the Monterey Jazz Festival.

In 1975, he recorded with Charles Tolliver and Pharoah Sanders.

In 1989 he moved from New York to California.

Discography
As leader/co-leader
 Message to our Ancestors (1969), with the flutist Black Harold (Universal City 73012) 
 Ethnic Fusion (1981–1982, with the guitarist Arthur Wheaton (1750 Arch 1790)

As sideman

 Randy (1964) – Randy Weston (Bakton)

 The Night of the Cookers (1965) – Freddie Hubbard (Blue Note Records)

 Monterey '66 (released 1994) – Randy Weston (Verve Records)

 Blue Spirits (released 1967) – Freddie Hubbard (Blue Note Records)

 Impact (1975) – Charles Tolliver's Music Inc. and Orchestra (Strata-East Records)

References

External links
Danny "Big Black" official website

Big Black Wide Hive Records (2009)
Phil Ranelin Perserverence Wide Hive Records (2011)

1934 births
Living people
American male film actors
American male television actors
American jazz musicians
American percussionists
African-American people
Actors from Savannah, Georgia
Musicians from Savannah, Georgia